The Deep is a CGI animated television series based on the comic book created by Tom Taylor and James Brouwer and published by Gestalt Comics. The series was developed by executive producer Robert Chandler, optioned by Technicolor, and produced by A Stark Production of Australia and the Canadian animation studio Nerd Corps Entertainment (credited to DHX Media). Commissioned by ABC, it premiered on 7two on 1 December 2015 and began broadcasting in Canada the following month on Family Chrgd. On 8 February 2018, a third season of the series was announced. On 26 July 2021, a fourth season was announced with 13 new half-hour episodes.

Synopsis
The series follows the Nektons, a family of adventurous underwater explorers who live aboard a state-of-the-art submarine called the Aronnax and explore unknown areas of the Earth's oceans to unravel the mysteries of the depths. Will Nekton's parents went missing trying to solve the riddle of how to get to the lost city of Lemuria, and the Nektons have refused to abandon it. Now, thanks to family friend Nereus, the Nektons know why they are so attracted to solving underwater riddles; because they are the descendants of Lemurians.

The main story arc involves the family's hunt for Lemuria. The story arc is introduced in the first episode, with finding the Chronicle of the Deep. It continues with interpreting its meaning, finding the pieces of the Ephemycron, encountering various Monumentials, interpreting the Ephemycron, and finally discovering Lemuria. However, not all episodes are part of the main story arc.

In season three, the Nektons discover Lemuria, and the main story becomes irrelevant. In season four, the family seek out William Nektons parents, who found Lemuria several months before them. Like previous seasons, not all episodes are part of this arc. Williams parents are found eaten by a monumental nautilus (very much alive), the nautilus is searching for a key to the sea, which keeps everything in balance.

Characters

The Nekton family
 Antaeus 'Ant' Nekton (voiced by Vincent Tong) is Nekton's youngest child and the son of Will and Kaiko Nekton. He has a pet fish named Jeffrey. He is adventurous, a believer in all things mythical and paranormal, and is always eager to explore the mysteries of the deep. As the youngest of the Lemurian royal family, he is the "Chosen One" according to Nereus and is able to use various Lemurian devices.
 Fontaine Nekton (voiced by Ashleigh Ball from "Here Be Dragons"-"The Maze", and Shannon Chan-Kent starting with "Finn Comes Aboard" and "The Missing") is Ant's older sister. She enjoys winding Ant up in various ways but always looks out for him. Smiling Finn has a crush on her.
 William 'Will' Nekton (voiced by Michael Dobson) is Ant and Fontaine's father. Once an Olympic swimmer, Will is now a passionate oceanographer. Like generations of Nektons before him, Will has devoted his life to uncovering the secrets of the sea.
 Kaiko Nekton (voiced by Kathleen Barr) is Antaeus and Fontaine's mother. She is shown to have great mechanical engineering skills and often pilots the Aronnax.
 Jeffrey (vocal effects provided by Haley Joel Osment) is Ant's pet Yellowback Basslet fish and best friend. He was rescued by Ant, who started to follow him. He seems to possess an unusual degree of intelligence and sometimes gets involved in adventures of his own while the Nektons are absent.
 William Nektons Parents went missing before episode 1 (season 1) and are re-United with their family in episode 13 series 4. They arrived in Lemuria a few weeks before William and Kaiko arrived. Then, they were eaten by a nautilus. They were finally re-United with their family in the last episode of season/series 4

Protagonists

 Professor Fiction (voiced by James Higuchi): The Nekton's scientific adviser, as well as the builder of the Arronax and the Knights. His inventions usually require tweaking and testing but are extremely effective when working correctly.
 Bob Gorman (voiced by Michael Kopsa): a close friend of the Nektons.
 Jess Gorman (voiced by Shannon Chan-Kent): the daughter of Bob Gorman, Fontaine's best friend, and the girl Ant has a crush on.
 Commander Pyrosome (voiced by Nicole Oliver): leader of the World Oceans Authority, usually only appears by video call.
 Kenji Nokumura (voiced by Lee Tockar): a Japanese man who lives alone on an island. Previously worked as a prop designer in kaiju films.
 Nereus (voiced by Lee Tockar): an eccentric old bearded man who gives the Nektons vague (but often unexpectedly useful) advice on their search for Lemuria. He is mysterious and often gives the Nektons advice in riddles. He sometimes arrives or appears unexpectedly, which initially unnerves the Nektons. In "Lemuria", it turns out he is about 6000 years old and the brother of the last Queen of Lemuria.
 Glaucus (voiced by Vincent Tong): another member of The Guardians lives on an island in the Pacific Ocean and has a major role in "The Purple Tide".
 Tethys is often a side character often with Glaucus. She mainly makes an appearance in ‘Proteus factor’ and otherwise is a background character.
 Agnus is a palaeontologist, and is saved by the Nektons after she, and Will, fell down a sinkhole. She is nice at the start of her single episode, but seems to flip at one point, after her dinosaur bones are only found out as 60 years old-ish. But at the end, she is happy and seems not as bad.

Antagonists

 Captain Hammerhead (voiced by Michael Dobson): Captain of the Dark Orca pirate crew. He is the father of Smiling Finn and Mad Madeline. Although he is a pirate and rough with anyone who gets in his way, he tries to be a good father to Finn and Madeline.
 Smiling' Finn Hammerhead (voiced by Samuel Vincent): Son of Captain Hammerhead and reluctant teen pirate. He has a crush on Fontaine, who calls him "Pirate Boy".
 Mad' Madeline Hammerhead (voiced by Kazumi Evans): Daughter of Captain Hammerhead and her father's pride and joy. She loves everything related to being a pirate and outwardly detests Ant and the Nektons, though is very jealous of their equipment.
 Danny Boy (voiced by Brian Drummond): First Mate of the Dark Orca pirate crew. Easily intimidated by Captain Hammerhead. He is a mechanic but struggles with poor equipment and a lack of materials on the Dark Orca, and his repairs and inventions usually break quickly.
 Proteus (voiced by Brian Drummond): a former member of The Guardians, he appears as the leader of the Guardians initially, until revealed as a traitor in "The Proteus Factor". He becomes an advisor to Alpheus Benthos after the events of "Tartaruga" until Alpheus ejects him from the submarine in "Hidden Secrets". After series 2, he is never seen, and theories of why start: from his ejection, and whether he was ever saved; or that he just didn’t bother to ever try again, we just don’t know.
 Sebastian Conger (Voiced by Ian James Corlett) A very wealthy businessman, he lives with his henchmen in a high-tech mobile underwater base. He first appears when he steals the last surviving example of a species of giant tortoise in "Lonesome Jim". He also attempts to take the Ephemycron and has stolen valuable artworks from a shipwreck.
 Alpheus Benthos (voiced by Andrew Francis) Descended from a "rogue branch" of the Lemurian royal family, Alpheus considers Ant to be his nemesis and is also attempting to find Lemuria, but for his own benefit. He lives on a nuclear fusion powered sub he built, along with the artificial intelligence A.R.I.A. Nereus once thought Alpheus was the Chosen One. He is usually quite calm and likes to ensure he is always in charge of any situation.
 Dolos (voiced by Brian Drummond): A selfish, snobby researcher who despises children and only cares about treasure, money, and his pet octopus Hydra. He operates out of the Floating Black Market and will do anything for enough money.
 Devil Daniels (voiced by Trevor Devall): an internet-famous "monster hunter" and vlogger. His adventures often clash with the Nekton's activities or have to be hindered by them to avoid harm to the targets of his hunts. As well as putting on a fake British accent, Daniels often fakes his adventures and has no consideration for animal welfare. He is cowardly and will do anything to gain and retain viewers besides placing himself in any real danger.
 Captain Hernandes is a single episode character, and also a friend of Sebastian Conger. In his episode (series 1 episode 17 \ LA*: AQ) he arrests the Nektons, plants fake evident on them and steals their Ephemycron piece
 Agnus MacNolan was a cowardly series 3 villain, who consistently stole different things from the Nektons for about 2 episodes. At the end, he is captured on commander pyrisome’s ship, after trying to hijack her ship. He is never heard from after that.
 Adele Flemming is the communicator for an internet company supplying most of England. Her company almost kills Ant, But indirectly, as her company sends a EMP through a cable, that ant is nearby. She tricks the Nektons, and she never owns up, instead trying to cover it up, a vocal slip up causes her plan to be foiled. Her company was charged by Kaiko, and it may be presumed that she was fired soon after, from costing the company a six digit number. (However, this was never proved) At the end of the episode, she apologises. To sum up her appearance, she is deceiving, irresponsible and tries to weasel out of much. However, unlike the pirates, or Alpheus, she was not super evil, for revenge or any suchlike. She is very similar to
 the Project manager from the deep sea mining corporation  could be argued as good or bad. In his episode, the Nektons (and professor Fiction) find a deep sea minor about to destroy some rare ‘bloop’ coral. He is very stubborn not to, but from his point of view, his operation may be very costly, to his company. At the end of his only episode, he is pleased.

Non-human characters

 A.R.I.A. is the highly sophisticated artificial intelligence that operates Alpheus Benthos' submarine. She was created by Alpheus' father and was turned into the AI mind of Alpheus's submarine.
 The Kraken, or The Terror, is a vast octopus-like creature that is locked up behind the gates of Lemuria. It first appears in "The Gates", and it tries to escape any time the gates of Lemuria are opened whilst also trying to destroy anyone and anything around the entrance. It is a Monumential, but unlike the others, doesn't seem to be simply a much larger version of its normal-sized counterpart.
 The Monumential Turtle is a gigantic turtle, initially mistaken for the island of Tartaruga, until it awakens and dives below the surface. It later appears in "The Purple Tide", where it nearly eats the Arronax by mistake; however, the turtle is one of the more benevolent monumentials, as opposed to their usually quite hostile nature.
 The Monumential Ray is a giant torpedo ray which usually sleeps below Catatumbo Bay, Venezuela. It is capable of generating enormous bolts of lightning, which it directs at anything which gets in its way. This lightning, besides using the Ephemycron, is the only way of opening the gates of Lemuria. It is accompanied by several smaller electric rays.
 the lobster monster is many lobsters in a hive. It has been around for about 100 years. It attacked a cable, which the Nektons anre asked to fix and is only in one episode. 
 A.I.M.Y was professor Fiction’s AI. She was the enemy for her only episode (S1E3/A:C), but her prime directive (to protect the Nektons) made her more protective than the Nektons (with fiction, while trying to rescue a Kayaker) and caused danger to the Nektons by trying to protect them.

Groups
 World Oceans Authority: The police and search-and-rescue of the open ocean. They target criminals on the oceans and rescue people in danger, but sometimes call the Nektons for assistance in some situations.
 Monumentials: Sea creatures are usually vastly bigger versions of a typical sea creature. They are generally quite hostile or just inherently dangerous. They are supposed to all be sleeping but have lately begun to awaken and can only be put back to sleep with the Queen's Sceptre.
 The Guardians: A group of people who work to preserve Lemurian culture and are extremely knowledgeable about anything to do with Lemuria but are usually reluctant to divulge too much. They are quite well equipped, having access to helicopters as seen in "The Proteus Factor", but prefer to travel by rowboat (or other small, open boats) over the ocean and are often encountered alone in one. They can communicate via special staffs, which can also be used to block other communications signals. They wear a characteristic dark grey robe with gold-coloured edging and were established by Nereus after the fall of Lemuria.

Singapore Myths

Characters
 (Dr) Jennifer Chan is in two episodes, and has a very optimistic personality. She went to college with Kaiko for six months. For ten years she has been chasing the legend of Raja Chulan. She is generally good natured but (quote) “my drive blinded me” says Dr Chan as her ending quote in her Main feature episode. She was desperate for the Glass case, and despite the Nektons disagreement, she try’s to buy time and take the case with them. A dragon stops her. 
 Raja Chulan a myth (age: about 800 years), in the chronicle of the deep. He wanted to explore the underwater, and the guardians wanted to find Lemuria, so they built him a glass case which could be lowered from a barge. He married an underwater princess and discovered the long lost city of Dika. 
 Mahtabu El Bahri was the underwater princess Raja Chulan Married. She had three children With him.  
 Sang Nila Ultama was the youngest of Raja Chulan and Mahtabu el Bahri they Founded Singapura, which is the old name for Singapore. 
 The Guardians, lead by Nereus, a teenager, helped build the glass case, and many years later, instructed dragons to protect the case. 
 Dragon 2 may be related to the dragon in Series 1 Episode 1 (s:a/e:a) (who the Nektons stole the chronicle of the deep from). It was probably employed by Nereus to protect Raja Chulan’s glass case from humans. However, the dragon then discovers the Nektons, Nereus, and (Dr) Jennifer Chan, trying to take the case. Unlike his relation, he successfully guards the case. And after a few reckless moments from (Dr) Jennifer Chan, they leave the dragon with the case.

The whole story
Raja Chulan made a deal with The Guardians lead by Nereus, 800 years ago, so they built him (Raja Chulan) a glass case, with a (quote) “hook that could allow it to be lowered by a barge”.  The Guardians built the case because they wanted to re-find Lemuria. Raja Chulan married a princess of the underwater realm called  Mahtabu El Bahri. Together they had three children, the youngest of which was called Sang Nila Ultama he founded Singapura, which is the old name for Singapore. Meanwhile, the glass case was abandoned in a cave, and the guardians employed a dragon to protect it. 100 years later a rockfall sealed the cave in. 680 years after that,  Dr Chan, growing up, heard of Raja Chulan’s legend. She searched for his glass case for 10 years, her assistant became Nereus, after his memory of Raja Chulan was jogged back to his mind. Fontaine videoed the entire experience, and (Dr) Jennifer Chan was back a few episodes later.

Objects

Lemurian
 Ephemycron: An ancient navigational device. It aligns with the stars and various markers around the world, placed by Lemurians, before then projecting a map which gives the locations of various points of interest, such as dangerous places to avoid, the locations of Monumentials, and other special sites. The first season revolves around the hunt for all three pieces of it, even though it is only introduced in "The Test". It is the main way of opening the gates of Lemuria, and only the youngest person in each line of the Lemurian royal family (I.e. Ant and Alpheus) can operate it.
 The Chronicle of the Deep: A kind of scroll that contains information about the Lemurian culture and associated artifacts and locations. It was hidden in a cave within an ocean trench that opens once every 40 years and is guarded by a giant plesiosaur-like sea monster until retrieved by the Nektons in "Here Be Dragons".  There are several different ways to open it, each of which reveals a different part of the Chronicle.
 The Sceptre of Queen Dorieas: also known as the Queen's Sceptre, the Sceptre is the only way of truly controlling the Monumentials and is the only way of returning them to their millennia-long sleep after they have awoken. The third season revolves around getting possession of it and using it for the first time. It activates when exposed to water and can reassemble itself if broken, as well as adhere to the hands of the person who is able to wield it.
 The Mythical Key to the Sea is discovered by the Nekton’s parents, as a myth. This is used as a new plot for a potential series 5
 The mechanical log from the kumari was a captains log, a relation of Alpheus. He was on a mission against the Queen of Lemuria.

Other
 Mystical Energy Cube is a mystical energy cube from series 2 episode 2 (Sb,Eb). Ant finds it in the Baltic Sea anomaly. It awakens a cloud of creatures which attack the aronax, and are only called away by Ants cube, which is a power source. At the end of the episode, Ant throws the mystical cube into the Sea anomaly to tempt the creatures away from the aronax. This is potentially Lemurian, but Ant passionately argues for Aleins
 The treasure of the islanders is a seedbank that the Nektons search for, to give to some islanders who have fallen on hard times. It is made of solid gold. Hammerhead also searches for it, for the gold.
 The dreaming mermaid is a statue the dark orca stole. It is too famous nobody would risk buying it. The Nektons return it.

Nektons
 Knights: Mechanised suits built by Professor Fiction for use by the Nektons. The White Knight is simpler than the others and was the first to be introduced, but is a good all-rounder. The Shadow Knight is fast ( top speed) and has a stealth mode and is usually used by Ant. The Swamp Knight is a powerful Knight and is as capable on land as it is in the water. The Mag Knight is a huge Knight, incredibly strong and powerful, with a lot of extra functions, and is usually used by Will. The Mimic Knight is a fast and agile Knight which somewhat resembles a mermaid, with an ability to "see" using echolocation and to change colour to blend in with other marine creatures. The Mimic Knight is usually used by Fontaine. The Jeffery Knight is a small fish bowl on a chassis and wheels, which Jeffery can use to get around when out of the water or to give extra protection outside the Arronax, it is controlled by his swimming. The Knights are usually made from carbon fiber composites.

 Arronax: The Nektons submarine. Described as the "world's largest submarine", it serves as the Nektons home and has a library, medical bay, and laboratory, kitchen, several bedrooms, a moon pool, and various other facilities. It has a system of tubes and cavities connected to fish tanks in several rooms, which Jeffery can use to travel around the submarine. Its hull is made from titanium, allowing it to withstand high temperatures and highly corrosive environments.
 The phantom sub was built by de-salazar Nekton. Who died many hundred years ago. His ship (as explained in his diary) can sense objects using water pressure, this is how it has been able to avoid collisions, and resulted in De-salazar’s descendant, Ant, Fontaine, William, Nereus, almost being hit by it.

Episodes

Season 1 (2015–16)

Season 2 (2017)

Season 3 (2018–19)

Season 4 (2022)

Broadcast and release
The series aired on Ici Radio-Canada Télé in Canada, and Universal Kids in the United States. The Deep was aired on CBBC in the UK, RTS Deux in Switzerland, Marvel HQ in India, La Trois in Belgium, Ketnet in Belgium, NRK in Norway, DR in Denmark, SVT in Sweden, YLE in Finland, Okto in Singapore, Super RTL in Germany, TVP ABC in Poland and eToonz in South Africa. In the United States, the series premiered on Netflix on 1 June 2016.

Home media
The series has been released on DVD in Australia by ABC DVD.

Awards
The series has been nominated for several awards, including a BAFTA award in 2018 and four AWGIE awards, for writing. In 2017, it won the AWGIE award for best Children's Television (C-classification) for the episode 'Beware the Sentinels', written by Thomas Duncan-Watt.

Reception 

The series was positively received. Emily Ashby of Common Sense Media described the series as a "fantastic family-focused adventure." She also argued that the series has "exceptional messages about working together, solving problems, and finding strength in those who love you" and called it an "excellent pick for families to enjoy together."

Notes

References

External links

 
 The Deep graphic novels published by Gestalt Comics
 The Deep Official Website

7two original programming
2015 Australian television series debuts
2010s Australian animated television series
2016 Canadian television series debuts
2010s Canadian animated television series
Australian computer-animated television series
Canadian computer-animated television series
Television series by DHX Media
English-language television shows
Australian children's animated action television series
Australian children's animated adventure television series
Australian children's animated drama television series
Australian children's animated science fiction television series
Canadian children's animated action television series
Canadian children's animated adventure television series
Canadian children's animated drama television series
Canadian children's animated science fiction television series
Nautical television series
Animated series based on comics
Television shows based on comics
Characters created by Tom Taylor (writer)
Canadian action adventure television series
Australian action adventure television series
Animated television series about families
Animated television series about children